Julius Gatambo (b 1939) was an Anglican bishop in Kenya during the last quarter of the twentieth century.

Gatambo was educated at St. Paul's University, Limuru and was ordained in 1974. He was bishop of Mount Kenya Central from 1993 to 2003.

References

20th-century Anglican bishops of the Anglican Church of Kenya
21st-century Anglican bishops of the Anglican Church of Kenya
Anglican bishops of Mount Kenya Central
St. Paul's University, Limuru alumni
1939 births
Living people